The Gibraltar Amateur Athletic Association is the governing body for the sport of athletics on Gibraltar.

Affiliations 
World Athletics
European Athletic Association (EAA)
British Olympic Association

National records 
The Gibraltar Amateur Athletic Association maintains the Gibraltar records in athletics.

External links 
Official webpage

Gibraltar
Sports governing bodies in Gibraltar
National governing bodies for athletics